James Sims may refer to:

 James Sims (American football) (born 1983), American football running back
 James Sims (physician) (1741–1820), Anglo-Irish physician
 James Leland Sims (1905–1977), member of the Legislative Assembly of Alberta
 J. Marion Sims (1813–1883), American physician